GoI most commonely refers to the Government of India.

Goi or GOI may refer to:

Government 
 Government of India
 Government of Indonesia
 Government of Iran
 Government of Iraq
 Government of Israel
 Government of Italy
 Goi Domain, in feudal Japan

People 
 Goi of Baekje (died 286), King of Baekje

Surname 
 Dero Goi (born 1970), German musician
 Ivan Goi (born 1980), Italian motorcycle racer
 Michael Goi (born 1959), American director and cinematographer
 Sam Goi (born 1949), Singaporean businessman
 Tommaso Goi (born 1990), Italian ice hockey player
 Wake Goi (born 1968), Papua New Guinean politician

Other uses 
 Goi (grape), a French wine grape
 Gỏi, a Vietnamese salad
 Goi Station, in Ichihara, Chiba, Japan
 Goa International Airport, India
 Grand Orient of Italy, a masonic organization
 Institute GOI (Goi-mailako Online Institutua), centre attached to the University of the Basque Country (UPV/EHU) created by UEU to promote online university studies.
 Getting Over It with Bennett Foddy, a video game
 A Grammar of Old Irish, a translation and edition by Osborn Bergin and D. A. Binchy of a book by Rudolf Thurneysen detailing the grammar of the Old Irish language

See also 
 Goy (disambiguation)
 Goia (disambiguation)
 Goin (disambiguation)
 Gois (disambiguation)